Plaza is a surname. Notable people with the surname include:

Aubrey Plaza, American actress and comedian
Daniel Plaza, Spanish track-and-field Olympian
Galo Plaza, Ecuadorian politician and former President of Ecuador
Leónidas Plaza, Ecuadorian politician and former President of Ecuador, father of Galo
Martin Plaza, Australian musician
Mélissa Plaza, French footballer
Ron Plaza, American baseball manager 
Rubén Plaza, Spanish cyclist
Willis Plaza, Trinidadian footballer